Sante Carollo (Montecchio Precalcino, 8 February 1924 – Thiene, 9 January 2004) was an Italian road cyclist.

His main occupation being a bricklayer, he became famous to the public for being the Maglia nera at the 1949 Giro d'Italia.  He formed a rivalry with Luigi Malabrocca for the Maglia nera at the Giro d'Italia.  He 'lost' the rivalry, earning the jersey once compared to Malabrocca's twice.

References

Italian male cyclists
Cyclists from the Province of Vicenza
1924 births
2004 deaths